Swanwick may refer to:

 Swanwick, Derbyshire, a village in England
 Swanwick, Hampshire, a village in England
 Swanwick, Illinois, United States
 Swanwick, Missouri, United States

Persons with the surname
 Anna Swanwick (1813–1899), English author and feminist
 Chris Swanwick (born 1993), British racing car driver
 Frederick Swanwick (1810–1885), English civil engineer 
 Frederick ffoulkes Swanwick (died 1913), Australian politician
Graham Swanwick (1906–2003), British judge
 Helena Swanwick (1864–1939), British feminist and pacifist 
 James Swanwick (born 1975), Australian-American investor and television host
 John Swanwick (1740–1798), American poet and politician
 Michael Swanwick (born 1950), American science fiction author
 Peter Swanwick (1912–1968), British actor 
 Peter Swanwick (cricketer)  (born 1945), English cricketer

See also
 Lower Swanwick